Lee v. Keith, 463 F.3d 763 (7th Cir. 2006) was a case in which, on September 18, 2006, the United States Court of Appeals for the Seventh Circuit struck down Illinois' ballot access laws, opining:

In combination, the ballot access requirements for independent legislative candidates in Illinois--the early filing deadline, the 10% signature requirement, and the additional statutory restriction that disqualifies anyone who signs an independent candidate's nominating petition from voting in the primary--operate to unconstitutionally burden the freedom of political association guaranteed by the First and Fourteenth Amendments. Ballot access barriers this high--they are the most restrictive in the nation and have effectively eliminated independent legislative candidacies from the Illinois political scene for a quarter of a century--are not sustainable based on the state's asserted interest in deterring party splintering, factionalism, and frivolous candidacies.

References

United States Court of Appeals for the Seventh Circuit cases
2006 in United States case law
2006 in Illinois
United States elections case law